[[Image:Colonel George Turnbull -- James Waylen picture.jpg|thumb|right|300px|"Colonel George Turnbull and sergeant play a strathspey, 1770, New York"  by James Waylen, 26x32inches, 1884. The text below includes the Colonel with a favorite sergeant, the solatium [compensation] of a strathspey after a weary day's work. The prostration of the regimental dog indicates the severity of the march, while the approach of the whisky induces the sergeant to beat time with encreased [stet] emphasis.Ann Arbor's William L. Clements Library Occasional Bulletins January 2018 page 19.]]
James Waylen in his 20s was already successful as an artist when he exhibited two portraits and a work entitled Marmion Borne Down by the Scottish Spearmen at Flodden at the Royal Academy of Arts in London in 1834 to 1838.

He was born in Devizes, Wiltshire in southern England on 19 April 1810 of Robert and Sarah Waylen. He on 2nd June 1829 came to the office'' [of the famous civil engineer Thomas Telford, designing London's St Katharine Docks].

Working in Telford's drawing office, he made long-life friends with another civil engineer the Scottish George Turnbull who in 1838 asked Waylen to travel from London to Huntingtower near Perth in Scotland to paint a portrait in oils of Turnbull's father William Turnbull who wrote to his son: 
Waylen seems just the same unassuming, kindhearted creature as when last here: his heart appears to be in his profession, and he has made more progress in it than could have been expected in the time; we find him very amusing in the accounts of his travels. He has been here more than a week and has made a success in making a likeness of me: everyone who sees it says the likeness is striking..

Waylen seems to have had a long artistic career in that he in about 1868 was commissioned by Turnbull to paint Turnbull's three children together. Yet later, in 1884, Waylen as a present to Turnbull painted Turnbull's great uncle Colonel George Turnbull.

References

1810 births
1894 deaths
19th-century English painters
People from Devizes